Sparrow Hill is a summit in Plymouth, Plymouth County, Massachusetts.

Sparrow Hill has the name of Richard Sparrow, a pioneer who was granted the land in 1637.

References

Landforms of Plymouth County, Massachusetts
Hills of Massachusetts